Kelly Makin is a Canadian  television and film director. He directed episodes of The Kids in the Hall comedy television series and also directed several episodes of Queer as Folk including the series finale. More recently, Makin has directed episodes of Flashpoint, Less Than Kind, Death Comes to Town, and Vikings. He also directed two episodes of Being Erica and Nurses. In 2020 and 2021, he had directed four episodes of Burden of Truth.

His film work includes Tiger Claws, National Lampoon's Senior Trip, Kids in the Hall: Brain Candy, and Mickey Blue Eyes.

Makin was bestowed a rare honor in 2009 by winning Gemini Awards for direction in two different categories: comedy series and dramatic series.

Awards
2009, Winner, Gemini AwardBest Direction in a Comedy Program or SeriesLess Than Kind, "The Daters"
2009, Winner, Gemini AwardBest Direction in a Dramatic SeriesFlashpoint, "Planets Aligned"
Academy of Canadian Cinema and Television

References

External links
 
 Filmbug.com bio

Canadian film directors
Living people
Canadian television directors
Year of birth missing (living people)